The protected areas of South Africa include national parks and marine protected areas managed by the national government, public nature reserves managed by provincial and local governments, and private nature reserves managed by private landowners. Most protected areas are intended for the conservation of flora and fauna. National parks are maintained by South African National Parks (SANParks). A number of national parks have been incorporated in transfrontier conservation areas.

Protected areas may also be protected for their value and importance as historical, cultural heritage or scientific sites. More information on these can be found in the list of heritage sites in South Africa.

Special Nature Reserves
Special nature reserves are highly protected areas from which all people and human activities are excluded, except for conservation and scientific research. The Prince Edward Islands, which are South African territories in the Southern Ocean, have been declared as a special nature reserve.

National Parks 

The following are the national parks of South Africa:
 
 
 
 
 
 
 
 
  (shared with Botswana)
 
 
 
  (visitors not allowed)
 
 
 
 
 
 
  (shared with Namibia)

Transfrontier conservation areas
South Africa is involved in the following transfrontier conservation areas (TFCAs), also known as "peace parks".
  – includes the Richtersveld in South Africa and the Fish River Canyon and Ai-Ais Hot Springs in Namibia
  – includes Kruger National Park and parks in Mozambique and Zimbabwe
  – includes the former Kalahari Gemsbok National Park in South Africa and Gemsbok National Park and Mabuasehube Game Reserve in Botswana
  – includes Golden Gate Highlands National Park, Sterkfontein Dam Nature Reserve, uKhahlamba Drakensberg Park and Royal Natal National Park in South Africa, and Sehlabathebe National Park in Lesotho
  – Mapungubwe National Park in South Africa, Northern Tuli Game Reserve in Botswana, and Tuli Circle Safari Area in Zimbabwe
  – including Phongolo Nature Reserve in South Africa and various farms in Swaziland
  – including Songimvelo Game Reserve in South Africa and Malolotja Nature Reserve in Swaziland
  – including Ndumo Game Reserve and Tembe Elephant Park in South Africa, Maputo Special Reserve in Mozambique, and Usuthu Gorge Conservancy in Swaziland.

The Lubombo Transfrontier Conservation Area, involving South Africa, Mozambique and Swaziland, is planned to be formed from the iSimangaliso Wetland Park and the Nsubane Pongola, Songimvelo-Malolotja and Usuthu-Tembe-Futi TFCAs.

Marine Protected Areas 

  (Eastern Cape)
  (Western Cape)
  (Eastern Cape)
  (Western Cape)
  (KwaZulu-Natal)
 
 
  (Western Cape)
  (Eastern Cape)
 
  (Western Cape)
 
  (Western Cape)
  (Eastern Cape)
  (Western Cape)
  (Western Cape)
  (Eastern Cape)
  (KwaZulu-Natal)
  (Western Cape)
  (Western Cape)
  (Western Cape)

  (Western Cape)

  (Southern Ocean)
  (Northern Cape)
  (Northern Cape)
  (Northern Cape)
  (KwaZulu-Natal)
  (Eastern Cape)
  (Prince Edward Islands)
  (KwaZulu-Natal)
  (Western Cape)
  (Western Cape)
  (Eastern Cape)
  (Western Cape)
  (Western Cape)
 
  (Western Cape)
  (Western Cape)
  (Eastern Cape)
  (Eastern Cape)
  (KwaZulu-Natal)
  (Western Cape)

World Heritage Sites 

World heritage sites in South Africa are protected by the World Heritage Convention Act (Act 49 of 1999). These include:
Fossil Hominid sites and environs of: 
 
 
 
 Protected Areas

 Cultural Landscape
 Cultural and Botanical Landscape

uKhahlamba/ Park

Botanical Gardens

UNESCO Biosphere Reserves of South Africa

Eastern Cape

National Parks situated in the Eastern Cape 

 
 , (Eastern Cape), also see Greater Addo Elephant National Park below
 
 , also see Garden Route National Park below

Mega Parks in the making, predominantly in the Eastern Cape 
 
  (Western Cape)
  (Western Cape)
 
 
 , (Eastern Cape).
 , (Eastern Cape).
 , (Eastern Cape).
 
 
 
 , (Western Cape)

Parks Managed by Eastern Cape Parks
 
 
 
 
  (consists of 12 smaller reserves)
 
 
 
 
  (accessed through the Kwelera National Botanical Garden)

Natural Heritage Sites

Private and Other Parks 
 Aberdeen Nature Reserve
 Alexandria Coast Reserve
 Amakhala Game Reserve
 Amalinda Nature Reserve
 
 
  see Baviaanskloof Mega Reserve
 
 
 
 
 
 
 
 
 
 
 
 
 
 
 
 
  (Mierhoopplaat)
  see Baviaanskloof Mega Reserve
 
 
 
 
 
 
 
 
 Kuzuko Private Game Reserve
 
 Kwantu Private Game Reserve
 
 
 
 
 
 Mbumbazi Nature Reserve

Forest Reserves 
 
 
 
 
 
 
 
 
 
 
 
 
 
 
 
 , part of the Tsitsikamma National Park

Protected Areas

Free State

National Parks

World Heritage Sites

Private and Other Parks
  around the Welbedacht Dam.
 
  formerly known as Hendrik Verwoerd Dam Nature Reserve, only on the Free State side of the Gariep Dam, the park on the Eastern Cape side of the dam is called the Oviston Nature Reserve.
  around the Kalkfontein Dam.
 
 
 
 
  around the Vanderkloof Dam.
 
  around the Bloemhof Dam (Free State) side only, the park on the North West is called the Bloemhof Dam Nature Reserve.
 
  around the Sterkfontein Dam.
  around the Krugersdrift Dam.
 , also at the Gariep Dam, on the other side of the Orange River is the Oviston Nature Reserve, Eastern Cape.
  around the Allemanskraal Dam.

Gauteng

GDACE Parks

Protected Areas

Other parks and private reserves
 
 
 
 
 
 
 
 
 
 
 
 
 
 
 
 
 
 
 
 
 
 
  (The Cradle)
 
 
 
 
 
 
 
 
 
Bishop Bird, Rooihuiskraal, Centuion

KwaZulu-Natal

Ezemvelo KZN Wildlife

  previously known as Greater St Lucia Wetland Park, including
 ,
 ,
 ,
  (the town is not part of the park)
 ,
 ,
 ,
 
 ,
 ,
 ,
 ,
 ,
 ,
  and
 .
 
 
 
 
 
 
 
 
 
 
 
  
 
 
 
 
  see also Cathedral Peak (South Africa)
  see also Cathedral Peak (South Africa)
 
 
  see also Giant's Castle
  see also Giant's Castle

Private and Other Parks
 
 
 
 
 
 
 
 
 
 , also see Dhlinza Forest

Natural Heritage Sites

Limpopo

National Parks

Provincial Parks

Private and Other Parks

  in the Greater Kruger National Park
 
 
 
 
 
 
 
 
 
 . See Mpumalanga, province.
  Private Game Reserve
 
 
 
 
 
 
 .
 
 
 
 
 
 
 
 
 
 
 
  
 
 
 
 
 
 
  region, Kruger NP
 
 
 
 
 
 
 
 
 
 
 
 
 
 Philip Herd Nature Reserve

Mpumalanga

National Parks

Provincial Parks 

 
  (mostly in Mpumalanga, small section in Limpopo)

Private and Other Parks
 
 
 
 
 
 
 Lionspruit, part of

Northern Cape

National Parks

Private and Other Parks

North West

National Parks

Provincial Parks

Protected Areas

Private and Other Parks

Western Cape

National Parks

Provincial Parks

West Coast

Winelands

Overberg

Cape Karoo

Garden Route and Little Karoo

Private and other Reserves 
 
 
 
 
 
 
 
 
 
  for the rest see Eastern Cape.

Forests 
 
 
  (Petrus Brand)
  Reserve (Goldfield)
  Area
 
 
  Reserve
  Reserve
 
  Reserve
  (Kruisfontein)

Natural Heritage Sites

Mountain Catchment Areas 
  Mountain Catchment Area
 
  Mountain Catchment Area
  Mountain Catchment Area
  Mountain Catchment Area
  Mountain Catchment Area
  Mountain Catchment Area
  East Mountain Catchment Area
  Mountain Catchment Area

See also

References

External links

 National Park
 South African National Parks (SANParks)
 National Environmental Management: Protected Areas Bill (39 of 2003)
 World Heritage Convention Act (49 of 1999)
 National Heritage Resources Act (25 of 1999)
 Astronomy Geographic Advantage Bill (61 of 2007)

 
South Africa
National parks
Protected areas
protected